Cyclodes  is a genus of moths of the family Noctuidae.

Description
Palpi smoothly scaled, where the second joint reaching vertex of head and minute third joint. Antennae simple. Thorax hairy. Abdomen with strong ridges of coarse hair. Tibia slightly hairy and spineless. Forewings with nearly rectangular apex. Outer margin obliquely rounded. Hindwings with vein 5 arise from above the angle of cell.

Species
 Cyclodes omma Hoeven, 1840
 Cyclodes spectans Snellen, 1886

References

 
 

Calpinae
Moth genera